Finnbjörn Þorvaldsson (25 May 1924 – 9 July 2018) was an Icelandic multi-sport athlete who competed in sprinting in the 1948 Summer Olympics.

Early life
Finnbjörn was born in Hnífsdalur, Westfjords. At a young age he moved to Ísafjörður an later to Reykjavík with his parents.

Sports career
Finnbjörn was best known for his achievements in track and field, especially in sprinting where won several national and nordic championships. He was the flag bearer for Iceland at the 1948 Summer Olympics where he competed in sprinting. He also competed in handball and basketball. He won the Icelandic national championship in handball in 1946 with Íþróttafélag Reykjavíkur after scoring the winning goal in ÍR's 20–19 victory against Haukar. In 1954, Finnbjörn won the national championship in basketball with ÍR's basketball team.

Death
Finnbjörn died on 9 July 2018 at the age of 94.

References

1924 births
2018 deaths
Athletes (track and field) at the 1948 Summer Olympics
Finnbjorn Thorvaldsson
Finnbjorn Thorvaldsson
Finnbjorn Thorvaldsson
Finnbjorn Thorvaldsson
Finnbjorn Thorvaldsson
Finnbjorn Thorvaldsson
Finnbjorn Thorvaldsson